Veeraporn Nitiprapha (born August 4, 1962 in Bangkok) is a Thai author of novels and short stories. Her work has been acclaimed for its distinctive lyrical character, often influenced by classical Thai literature, and its subtle reflection on human relationship in modern Asian society and its intersection with current politics. Her first novel Saiduean Ta Bod Nai Khaowongkot (Blind Earthworms in a Labyrinth) won the prestigious Southeast Asian Writers Award (also known as S.E.A. Write Award) in 2015 and established her among the leading Southeast Asian writers of her generation. Nitiprapha has published several short stories in magazines, which are noted for their innovative narrative techniques and stylistic richness. Her second novel Phutthasakkarat Asadong Kub Song Jam Khong Song Jam Khong Maew Kularb Dam (Memories of the Memories of the Black Rose Cat) won S.E.A. Write Award in 2018, making her the first woman to win the literary award twice.

Biography 
Born in Bangkok, Veeraporn Nitiprapha was the second of two children in her family. She grew up and spent most of her life in Bangkok. She started writing and publishing poems and short stories at the age of 17. After a short period of studies in Melbourne, Australia, she returned to Bangkok and began her first career as an editor for a fashion magazine and then a copywriter for various advertising agencies, later becoming a creative director. She then decided to leave the advertising industry and turned to jewelry design. Since her jewelry brand, which she had run for more than a decade, closed down, she has been devoting herself entirely to writing.

Nitiprapha is married and has a son. She lives in Bangkok. She is known to be an avid gardener and a cat lover.

Work in Translation 
  (Translated into English as The Blind Earthworm in the Labyrinth by Kong Rithdee; River Books, 2019)
  (Translated into English as Memories of the Memories of the Black Rose Cat by Kong Rithdee; River Books, 2022)

External links 
 2015 S.E.A. Write Award Speech
 An interview in Bangkok Post
 An interview in BK Magazine

References 

1962 births
Veeraporn Nitiprapha
S.E.A. Write Award winners
Veeraporn Nitiprapha
Veeraporn Nitiprapha
Living people